Moshe Hirschbein (var. Hirszbein, Hirszbain, Hirszbajn) (1894 – 1940) was a Polish chess master.

Born into a Jewish family, he lived in Łódź, playing in many local tournaments. In 1912, he took 7th (Efim Bogoljubow won), twice took 4th (Quadrangular) in 1913 and 1916/17 (both won by Gersz Salwe, and won a match against Samuel Factor (+4 –2 =4) in 1917. After World War I, he won (Quadrangular) in 1920/21, took 3rd in 1925, and tied for 14-15th in the 2nd Polish Chess Championship, Akiba Rubinstein won) in 1927.

He died during World War II in the Lodz Ghetto.

References 

1940 deaths
Jewish chess players
Polish chess players
Sportspeople from Łódź
People who died in the Łódź Ghetto
Polish civilians killed in World War II
1894 births
20th-century chess players